Roy Lopez may refer to:

Roy Lopez (American football) (born 1997), American football player
Roy Lopez Jr., criminal and member of the Bling Ring

See also
 Ruy Lopez (disambiguation)